Kiunga is a genus of blue-eyes endemic to Papua New Guinea. The generic name refers to the port town of Kiunga in western Papua New Guinea, the type of the type species, Kiunga ballochi having been collected in the vicinity of this settlement.

Species
There are currently two recognized species in this genus:
 Kiunga ballochi G. R. Allen, 1983 (Glass blue-eye)
 Kiunga bleheri G. R. Allen, 2004

References

 
Pseudomugilinae
Freshwater fish of Papua New Guinea
Endemic fauna of Papua New Guinea